Verkhneosinovsky is a rural locality (a khutor) in Nizhneosinovskoye Rural Settlement, Surovikinsky District, Volgograd Oblast, Russia. The population was 141 as of 2010.

Geography 
Verkhneosinovsky is located near the two Rivers, 17 km northwest of Surovikino (the district's administrative centre) by road. Starikovsky is the nearest rural locality.

References 

Rural localities in Surovikinsky District